Birding Business was a free business publication that served as a trade news source for the wild bird and nature products industry. It was based in O’Lakes, Florida. The magazine was published five times each year by Longdown Management, Inc. It started in 1995. The last issue of the magazine was published in September 2015.

See also
List of journals and magazines relating to birding and ornithology

References

External links
Birding Business

1995 establishments in Florida
2015 disestablishments in Florida
Business magazines published in the United States
Defunct magazines published in the United States
Free magazines
Journals and magazines relating to birding and ornithology
Magazines established in 1995
Magazines disestablished in 2015
Magazines published in Florida
Professional and trade magazines